Vierling may refer to persons named Vierling:

Alfred Vierling, Dutch far right politician and activist
C. Kersey Vierling, California Superintendent of Public Instruction in the 1930s
Johann Gottfried Vierling, German composer (1750–1813)
Georg Vierling, German composer (1820–1901)
Matt Vierling, American baseball player
Oskar Vierling, German  professor and inventor of the Electrochord
Wilhelm Johannes Vierling, mayor of German city of Leipzig in 1945
Christine Nordhagen-Vierling, Canadian wrestler

Vierling may also refer to:
a combination gun with four barrels (from the German word for quadruplet)